The Pakistan and West Indies cricket teams played a series of three one day international (ODI) matches in Abu Dhabi, United Arab Emirates, between November 12 and November 16, 2008. The Pakistanis won all three matches.

Squads

Matches

1st ODI

2nd ODI

3rd ODI

References

External links

2008 in Pakistani cricket
2008 in West Indian cricket
West
West
2009 in Pakistani cricket
2009 in West Indian cricket
Cricket in the United Arab Emirates
International cricket competitions in 2008–09
Pakistani cricket seasons from 2000–01
2008–09